Libya of Egypt is the daughter of Epaphus, King of Egypt, in both Greek and Roman mythology. She personified the land of Ancient Libya in North Africa, from which the name of modern-day Libya originated.

Greek mythology

In Greek mythology, Libya, like Ethiopia or Scythia was one of the mythic outlands that encircled the familiar Greek world of the Hellenes and their "foreign" neighbors.

Personified as an individual, Libya was the daughter of Epaphus—King of Egypt, and the son of Zeus and Io—and Memphis. Libya was ravished by the god Poseidon to whom she bore twin sons, Belus and Agenor. Some sources name a third son, named Lelex. According to late accounts, Lybee (Libya) consorted instead with Zeus and became the mother of Belus. In Hyginus' Fabulae, Libye was called the daughter of Palamedes (corrected as Epaphus), who mothered Libys by Hermes.

Roman mythology

The territory that she ruled, Ancient Libya, and the country of modern-day Libya are named after her.

Argive genealogy in Greek mythology

Notes

References

Isidore, Etymologiae xiv.4.1, 5.1
Augustine, De civitate dei xviii.12
Lactantius Placidus, Commentarii in Sattii Thebaida iv.737
Gaius Julius Hyginus, Fabulae from The Myths of Hyginus translated and edited by Mary Grant. University of Kansas Publications in Humanistic Studies. Online version at the Topos Text Project.
Pseudo-Clement, Recognitions from Ante-Nicene Library Volume 8, translated by Smith, Rev. Thomas. T. & T. Clark, Edinburgh. 1867. Online version at theio.com

Princesses in Greek mythology
Egyptian characters in Greek mythology
Libyan characters in Greek mythology
Africa in Roman mythology